Falling in Love Again is a 2003 animated stereoscopic 3D film directed by Munro Ferguson, about a man and woman tossed aloft during a car accident, who fall in love while plummeting to the ground. Set to the song Falling in Love Again (Can't Help It) as sung by Marlene Dietrich, it was created by Ferguson at the National Film Board of Canada, using IMAX's SANDDE stereoscopic drawing system. It won a Canadian Genie Award for Best Animated Short in 2003. It was also included in the Animation Show of Shows.

References

External links
 

2003 films
National Film Board of Canada animated short films
2003 3D films
Best Animated Short Film Genie and Canadian Screen Award winners
Canadian 3D films
2000s animated short films
2003 animated films
2003 short films
Animated musical films
3D animated short films
2000s Canadian films